Orbelín Pineda Alvarado (born 24 March 1996) is a Mexican professional footballer who plays as a midfielder for Greek Super League club AEK Athens, on loan from Celta, and the Mexico national team.

Club career

Querétaro
Pineda was first called up to the Querétaro senior team on 21 January 2014, for a Copa MX match against Ascenso MX side Celaya and made his debut as a second-half substitute in a 1–0 loss. Pineda made his Liga MX debut on 1 August 2014, in a 2–0 victory against Pachuca.

On 24 January 2015, he scored his first goal in a league match against Pachuca in a 1–2 loss. He was considered a pivotal part of the team as Querétaro reached the Clausura championship finals, only to succumb to Santos Laguna following an aggregate score of 5–3.

Guadalajara
On 2 December 2015, Guadalajara announced they had signed Pineda for an undisclosed price on a five-year contract. Pineda made his official debut as a starter on 10 January 2016, against Veracruz. He scored his first goal for the club on 16 January 2016, against Cruz Azul in a 1–1 tie.

On 10 July, he would score the first goal in the 2016 Supercopa MX against Veracruz which finished 2–0.

In April 2017, Guadalajara won the Clausura Copa MX final against Morelia. The following month, they disputed Clausura championship against Tigres UANL, as Guadalajara would go on to win the title, finishing an eleven-year-long drought of league titles. As a result, Guadalajara won their first Double since the 1969–70 season.

In April 2018, Guadalajara went on to win the CONCACAF Champions League Finals against Major League Soccer team Toronto FC following a penalty shoot-out victory of 4–2.

Cruz Azul
In December 2018, it was announced Cruz Azul signed Pineda for $12 million. He made his debut with the team on 4 January 2019, in 1–1 draw against Puebla.

In July 2019, he would win the Supercopa MX after defeating Necaxa 4–0. In September, he would also go on to win the inaugural Leagues Cup after defeating Tigres UANL 2–1.

Pineda played an integral part in Cruz Azul's championship-winning Guardianes 2021 campaign.

Celta de Vigo
On 7 January 2022, Pineda signed a five-year contract with Spanish club Celta de Vigo.

AEK Athens (loan) 
On 15 July, Pineda joined Greek club AEK Athens on a season-long loan, rejoining former Guadalajara manager Matías Almeyda. Pineda made his debut on 20 August in a league match against Lamia, as a starter, he scored a goal and contributed an assist in a 3–0 victory.

International career

Youth
Pineda was called up to the under-20 side by manager Sergio Almaguer to take part in the 2015 FIFA U-20 World Cup in New Zealand. He made his debut in Mexico's opening match as a half-time substitution for José David Ramírez. Mexico went on to lose the game 2–0 to Mali. Pineda started the next two matches for Mexico, but the team finished in 4th place in their group and failed to qualify to the next round.

Senior
Pineda was included in the provisional roster for the 2015 CONCACAF Gold Cup by Miguel Herrera but was cut from the final list, remaining in the Provisional List if someone else got injured. He was called up again, this time by Juan Carlos Osorio, to be included in Mexico's provisional squad for the Copa América Centenario but was cut from the final squad. Pineda would make his senior national team debut on 6 September 2016 against Honduras during a 2018 FIFA World Cup qualification match, coming in as a substitute for Jesús Dueñas at the 71st minute, finishing in a scoreless draw.

He was included in the finalized roster that would participate at the 2017 CONCACAF Gold Cup, where on 9 July he would score his first goal with the senior national team during a group stage match against El Salvador, scoring the final goal of a 3–1 win.

In June 2019, Pineda was included in Gerardo Martino's 2019 CONCACAF Gold Cup roster. Mexico went on to win the tournament.

Pineda participated at the 2021 Gold Cup, scoring a total of 3 times and contributing one assist. Mexico finished runner-up after losing the final to the United States 0–1.

In October 2022, Pineda was named in Mexico's preliminary 31-man squad for the 2022 FIFA World Cup, and in November, he was ultimately included in the final 26-man roster.

Style of play
He is able to play as a deep-lying, roaming or more advanced playmaker, he has regularly played as the more advanced of the two in a 4-2-3-1 formation. A fantastic reader of the game, Pineda can spot incisive through balls and is able to find space on the pitch by moving into the channels between defenders. Former Guadalajara manager Matías Almeyda described Pineda as "one of those players that has to end up in a great European club. He has the talent and the attributes." He is technically sharp, skillful, and with a turn of pace able to burst past opponents but at his short stature, he isn't the strongest player, although his development may have been held up by the fact he's been moved from an attacking midfielder to the holding role and even on the wing since he debuted in the first division in late 2014.

Personal life
His older brother, Onay was also a professional footballer who played as a right-back.

Career statistics

Club

International

Scores and results list Mexico's goal tally first, score column indicates score after each Pineda goal.

Honours
Guadalajara
Liga MX: Clausura 2017
Copa MX: Clausura 2017
Supercopa MX: 2016
CONCACAF Champions League: 2018

Cruz Azul
Liga MX: Guardianes 2021
Supercopa MX: 2019
 Leagues Cup: 2019

Mexico
CONCACAF Gold Cup: 2019

Individual
Liga MX All-Star: 2021

References

External links
 
 

1996 births
Mexican footballers
Living people
Mexico under-20 international footballers
Footballers from Guerrero
Liga MX players
La Liga players
Super League Greece players
Querétaro F.C. footballers
C.D. Guadalajara footballers
RC Celta de Vigo players
AEK Athens F.C. players
Association football midfielders
Mexico international footballers
2017 CONCACAF Gold Cup players
2019 CONCACAF Gold Cup players
2021 CONCACAF Gold Cup players
CONCACAF Gold Cup-winning players
Mexican expatriate footballers
Expatriate footballers in Spain
Expatriate footballers in Greece
Mexican expatriate sportspeople
Mexican expatriate sportspeople in Spain
Mexican expatriate sportspeople in Greece
2022 FIFA World Cup players